Zahara Schatz (1916–1999), was an Israeli artist, craftsperson, and designer. She was the daughter of Boris Schatz, who founded the Bezalel Academy of Art and Design in Jerusalem. She was best known for the six-branched menorah she designed for the entrance to the Yad Vashem, Israel's official memorial to the victims of the Holocaust.

Early life and education

Zohara ("Zahara") Schatz (later Sandow) was born on July 20, 1916 in Jerusalem, Jerusalem Sanjak, Ottoman Empire. Her father was Boris Schatz and her brother was artist Bezalel or "Lilik".

She studied at the École nationale supérieure des arts décoratifs (English: National School of Decorative Arts) in Paris from 1934 to 1937. As well as classes at Académie de la Grande Chaumière.

The Schatz children were both artists and rejected their father's predilection for Romantic Classicism and his dogged development of a Jewish Eretz Israel-style, in favor of a European-American modernism. However she followed her father's dualism: the pursuit of both fine art and crafts (or design).

Career 
After graduation Schatz moved to the United States, settling in California. She married American sculptor Elliott Franz Sandow (1910–1976). In the 1940s Schatz taught art classes at the California Labor School in Berkeley. She started working in plastic in the 1940s, designing and building acrylic lamps.

Schatz was part of the Big Sur artists'/writers' colony that included San Francisco sculptor Benny Bufano, author Henry Miller, her sister-in-law Louise Schatz, and her brother Bezalel Schatz. She lived in Berkeley, California, where she was close with courtroom sketch artist Rosalie Ritz, her husband Erwin Ritz and their daughter, publisher and managing editor of The Environmentalist, Janet Ritz.

She rose to prominence in Israel and overseas during this time, and Schatz exhibited and won prestigious prizes in the U.S. and Europe. In 1951, Schatz won an award for the Table Lamp Model No. T-4-S, at the Museum of Modern Art (MoMA) in New York City. Her winning table lamp design was manufactured by the Heifez Company, the sponsor of the MoMA competition.

In the same year of 1951, she returned to Israel, however she maintained a residency in Berkeley, California up until the 1970s. In 1951, Zahara Schatz, Bezalel Schatz, and her sister-in-law Louise Schatz formed a craft workshop "Yaad" located in Israel, and rooted in European-American modernism.

In 1959, she participated in the Venice Biennale of 1959 and designed the gate, built at the Bezalel Academy for Art and Design for the President's House.

She worked as an adviser on industrial design at the Ministry of Commerce and Industry for Israel.

Schatz died of a long illness in Jerusalem on August 4, 1999, at the age of 83.

Awards and recognition
 1951: award for a table lamp design, Table Lamp Model No. T-4-S, "Low-Cost Lighting Competition/Exhibition", the Museum of Modern Art, New York City, New York
 1955: Israel Prize, for the Fine Arts Award
 1954: medal of honor, Milan Triennial (Triennale di Milano)
 1959: Dizengoff Prize for Sculpture
 1959: participation in the Venice Biennale
 1960: Yad Vashem Prize, for a six-branch candelabrum
 1991: Shoshanna Ish-Shalom Prize, Jerusalem

Exhibitions
 "Zahara Schatz: A Retrospective. The Third Exhibition in the Schatz House Series, celebrating 100 Years of Israeli Art," The Artists' House, Jerusalem, 2006.

See also
List of Israeli women artists
List of Israel Prize recipients
Visual arts in Israel

References

Further reading
 Eva Elisa Wardi (2005). "The poet of light, Zahara Schatz," documentary film, Jerusalem: Israel Museum, The Gabriel Scherover Information Center of Israeli Art, DVD collections, 52 min.:48 sec.
 Exhibition catalog, Gideon Ofrat (2006). Zahara Schatz 1916–999, Jerusalem: The Artists' House.
 Meir Ronnen (20 July 2006). "The last Schatz," The Jerusalem Post.

External links
 
 
Israeli Art Guide

1916 births
1999 deaths
20th-century Israeli painters
20th-century Israeli women artists
20th-century Israeli Jews
Israeli women painters
Jewish painters
Jews in Mandatory Palestine
Israel Prize in sculpture and painting recipients
Israel Prize women recipients
Artists from Jerusalem
Artists from Berkeley, California
People from Big Sur, California